Turning Point is a professional wrestling Impact Plus event, produced by American professional wrestling promotion Impact Wrestling. The event was created in 2004 and was originally held annually in December, until the 2008 event where TNA changed its scheduled date to November. The 2004 event was the second TNA PPV to be produced annually. Since its inception, the event has been held exclusively in an indoor arena in Orlando, Florida, with all events taking place in the Impact Zone until 2019. Each event features talent from TNA competing in various professional wrestling match types. Since the inaugural event, eight championship matches have taken place in the main event.

TNA discontinued the majority of the monthly pay-per-views in 2013 in favor of new pre-recorded One Night Only events. Turning Point was held as a special episode of Impact Wrestling in 2013, 2015 and 2016 and, in 2019, was revived as an Impact Plus Monthly Special event.

History 
Turning Point is a pay-per-view event consisting of a main event and undercard that feature championship matches and other various matches. The first event was held December 5, 2004 and aired live on PPV, and was the second event held by TNA to be established as an annual PPV. Since then, TNA has produced the event in December until 2007. However, in 2008, TNA chose without explanation to hold the event in November and produce Final Resolution in December. On January 11, 2013, TNA announced that only four pay-per-view events would be held that year, dropping Turning Point and the majority of its other PPV events. Each Turning Point event has been held in an indoor arena, with all events taking place in the Impact Zone in Orlando, Florida until 2019.

Events

References

External links 
 ImpactWrestling.com - the official website of Total Nonstop Action Wrestling
 TNATurningPoint.com - the official website of TNA Turning Point

 
Recurring events established in 2004